Reid-Woods House is a Mediterranean Revival-style house located at 373 Whitfield Avenue in the Whitfield Estates subdivision in the southern part of Manatee County, Florida. Built c. 1926, it was listed on the National Register of Historic Places in 2000.

It is "a finely detailed" house with an irregular plan.  It has "multiplanar roofs, including gable, hip, flat, and
shed roofs", with all but the flat roof sections covered by barrel clay tile.

Its interior floor plan remained intact as of its NRHP listing in 2000.

References

National Register of Historic Places in Manatee County, Florida
Houses completed in 1924
Houses in Manatee County, Florida
Mediterranean Revival architecture in Florida
Houses on the National Register of Historic Places in Florida